Insaan may refer to:

Aadmi Aur Insaan, 1969 Hindi film produced by B. R. Chopra and directed by Yash Chopra
Insaan (1944 film), 1944 Bollywood film directed by Babu Bhai Jani
Insaan (1952 film), 1952 Bollywood film directed by Jagdish Sethi
Insaan (1966 film), 1966 Urdu film of Pakistan directed by Zia Sarhadi
Insaan (1982 film), 1982 Bollywood film directed by Narendra Bedi
Insaan Aur Shaitan, 1970 Bollywood action film directed by Aspi Irani
Janwar Aur Insaan, 1972 Hindi movie directed by Tapi Chanakya
Zehreela Insaan, 1974 Hindi movie
Insan, 2005 Bollywood movie